Attorney General Miller may refer to:

Albert C. Miller (1898–1979), Attorney General of South Dakota
Andrew Miller (North Dakota judge) (1870–1960), Attorney General of North Dakota
Andrew P. Miller (born 1932), Attorney General of Virginia
Bert H. Miller (1876–1949), Attorney General of Idaho
Robert Byron Miller (1825–1902), Attorney-General of Tasmania
Tom Miller (politician) (born 1944), Attorney General of Iowa
Vern Miller (1928–2021), Attorney General of Kansas
Victor A. Miller (1916–1984), interim Attorney General of Wisconsin
William H. H. Miller (1840–1917), Attorney General of the United States

See also
 General Miller (disambiguation)